Extracellular adenylate cyclase is an adenylate cyclase produced by Bordetella pertussis.

References

EC 4.6.1